Hsu Yue-yun (born 20 September 1957) is a Taiwanese former freestyle, butterfly and medley swimmer. She competed in seven events at the 1972 Summer Olympics.

References

External links
 

1957 births
Living people
Taiwanese female butterfly swimmers
Taiwanese female freestyle swimmers
Taiwanese female medley swimmers
Olympic swimmers of Taiwan
Swimmers at the 1972 Summer Olympics
Place of birth missing (living people)
Asian Games medalists in swimming
Asian Games bronze medalists for Chinese Taipei
Swimmers at the 1970 Asian Games
Medalists at the 1970 Asian Games
20th-century Taiwanese women